Sevastian "Bebe" Iovănescu (2 October 1953 in Ghelmegioaia – 29 March 2010 in Constanța) was a Romanian football player.

Career
Iovănescu played over 350 matches in the Romanian first division, scoring more than 50 goals, with Steaua București, Argeș Pitești, Olt Scornicești and Farul Constanța.

Iovănescu made one appearance at international level for Romania, playing on 13 May 1979 under coach Florin Halagian in a 1–1 against Cyprus at the Euro 1980 qualifiers.

Honours
Argeș Pitești
Divizia A: 1978–79
Farul Constanța
Divizia B: 1987–88

Death
He died from a viral infection at age 56 in March 2010.

References

External links

1953 births
2010 deaths
People from Mehedinți County
Romanian footballers
Romania international footballers
Liga I players
Liga II players
FC Steaua București players
FCV Farul Constanța players
FC Argeș Pitești players
FC Olt Scornicești players
Association football midfielders